Rif Dimashq offensive may refer to Syrian Civil War offensives:
Rif Dimashq offensive (August–October 2012) by the Syrian Army
Rif Dimashq offensive (November 2012–February 2013) by the Free Syrian Army and Al-Nusra Front
Rif Dimashq offensive (March–August 2013) by the Syrian Army
Rif Dimashq offensive (September–November 2013) by the Syrian Army
Rif Dimashq offensive (August–November 2014) by the Syrian Army
Rif Dimashq offensive (September 2015) or the battle of Allah al-Ghalib, by Jaysh al-Islam and others
Rif Dimashq offensive (April–May 2016) by the Syrian Army
Rif Dimashq offensive (June–October 2016) by the Syrian Army
Rif Dimashq offensive (February–April 2018) by the Syrian Army

See also
Rif Dimashq clashes (November 2011–March 2012)